Psalms is a book of the Hebrew Bible and the Christian Old Testament.

Psalm may also refer to:

Psalms I, II, III, three commentaries by Mitchell Dahood
Psalm West, youngest son of Kanye West and Kim Kardashian

Music
The "Swiss Psalm", Switzerland's national anthem
Psalms, choral work by Lukas Foss (1922–2009)
"Psalm", a song by Roxy Music from Stranded

Albums
Psalm (Paul Motian album), 1982
Psalm (Terl Bryant album), 1993
Psalms (album), a 2002 album by Shane & Shane
Psalms II (album), a 2015 album by Shane & Shane
Psalms, Tex Ritter 1958
Psalms, Richard Smallwood 1997
Psalms, Jah Wobble 1995
Psalms (EP), Hollywood Undead 2018